The Miravalles Volcano is an andesitic stratovolcano in Costa Rica. The caldera was formed during several major explosive eruptions that produced voluminous dacitic-rhyolitic pyroclastic flows between about 1.5 and 0.6 million years ago.  The only reported historical eruptive activity was a small steam explosion on the SW flank in 1946. High heat flow remains, and Miravalles is the site of the largest developed geothermal field in Costa Rica.

The heat from the volcano also helps power a geothermal energy plant at Las Hornillas, which is run by the Institute of Electricity.

References 

Active volcanoes
Stratovolcanoes of Costa Rica
Calderas of Central America
Mountains of Costa Rica